Aberconwy is a constituency represented in the House of Commons of the UK Parliament since 2019 by Robin Millar, a Conservative.

The seat was created by the Welsh Boundary Commission for the 2010 general election, and replaced the old north Wales seat of Conwy. The same boundaries have been used for the Aberconwy 
Senedd constituency since the 2007 Welsh Assembly election.

Boundaries 

The constituency is a new creation of the Boundary Commission for Wales and was based on the existing Conwy seat. It is centred on Llandudno, Conwy town and associated suburbs such as Deganwy and Penrhyn Bay, along with the Conwy Valley. The other main component of the former Conwy seat, Bangor, is removed to the new Arfon constituency.

The name Aberconwy was chosen partly to avoid confusion between the former Conwy parliamentary seat (which, confusingly, had been the name first proposed by the commission for the new seat), the existing county borough, town council and ward name. The seat is exactly co-terminous with the old Aberconwy district, abolished in 1996, and thus the name was thought to be a natural one with which to name the new constituency. Bangor, the main Labour voting area of the former Conwy constituency, is no longer within the constituency, whereas the more Conservative areas such as Llandudno and Conwy itself are retained. The constituency is diverse, combining Welsh-speaking rural areas, English-speaking coastal dwellers, many affluent suburbs, pockets of relative poverty, seaside resorts such as Llandudno and more industrial areas such as Llandudno Junction. In many ways the new Aberconwy seat resembles its neighbour Clwyd West (the other seat covering Conwy County Borough) to a large degree, as both seats have a similar social profile and, as seems likely, a similar voting pattern.

The wards of Conwy County Borough that were incorporated into the new Aberconwy seat are:

Betws-y-Coed, Bryn, Caerhun, Capelulo, Crwst, Conwy, Craig Y Don, Deganwy, Eglwysbach, Gogarth, Gower, Llansanffraid Glan Conwy, Marl, Mostyn, Pandy, Pant Yr Afon/Penmaenan, Penrhyn, Pensarn, Trefriw, Tudno and Uwch Conwy.

Members of Parliament

Elections

Elections in the 2010s 

Of the 69 rejected ballots:
49 were either unmarked or it was uncertain who the vote was for.
20 voted for more than one candidate.

 

Of the 59 rejected ballots:
33 were either unmarked or it was uncertain who the vote was for.
12 voted for more than one candidate.
14 had writing or mark by which the voter could be identified.

 

Of the 78 rejected ballots:
58 were either unmarked or it was uncertain who the vote was for.
20 voted for more than one candidate.

Of the 123 rejected ballots:
102 were either unmarked or it was uncertain who the vote was for.
20 voted for more than one candidate.
1 had writing or mark by which the voter could be identified.

See also
 Aberconwy (Senedd constituency)
 List of parliamentary constituencies in Clwyd
 List of parliamentary constituencies in Wales

Notes

References

External links 
Politics Resources (Election results from 1922 onwards)
Electoral Calculus (Election results from 1955 onwards)
2017 Election House Of Commons Library 2017 Election report
A Vision Of Britain Through Time (Constituency elector numbers)

Parliamentary constituencies in North Wales
Constituencies of the Parliament of the United Kingdom established in 2010